Stanley Hirst (1876 – June 1950) was a British trade unionist.

Born in Huddersfield, Hirst left school at the age of ten to work in a mill, then later became a tram driver.  He joined the Amalgamated Association of Tramway and Vehicle Workers, soon becoming its full-time assistant general secretary, then in 1917 the general secretary.  He took this into a merger which in 1919 formed the United Vehicle Workers, becoming general secretary of the new union, then in 1922, he led the union into the merger which formed the Transport and General Workers' Union (TGWU), becoming financial secretary of the new union.

Hirst was also active in the Labour Party, sitting on its National Executive Committee (NEC) from 1930, and serving as Chairman of the Labour Party in his first year.  He retired both from the NEC and from his union posts in 1941.

References

1876 births
1950 deaths
Chairs of the Labour Party (UK)
Trade unionists from Huddersfield